Events in the year 1918 in Japan.

Incumbents
Emperor: Taishō
Prime Minister:
Terauchi Masatake (until September 29)
Hara Takashi (from September 29)

Governors
Aichi Prefecture: Matsui Shigeru
Akita Prefecture: Hijoki Kawaguchi 
Aomori Prefecture: Takeji Kawamura (until 3 October); Ushimaro Sawada (starting 3 October)
Ehime Prefecture: Raizo Wakabayashi 
Fukui Prefecture: Kawashima Miki 
Fukushima Prefecture: Takukichi Kawasaki 
Gifu Prefecture: Kanokogi Kogoro 
Gunma Prefecture: Tomojiro Nakagawa 
Hiroshima Prefecture: Eitaro Mabuchi (until 7 May); Yasukouchi Asakichi (starting 7 May)
Hyogo Prefecture: Seino Chotarno (until month unknown)
Ibaraki Prefecture: Yuichiro Chikaraishi 
Iwate Prefecture: Rinpei Otsu
Kagawa Prefecture: Sakata Kanta 
Kanagawa Prefecture: Chūichi Ariyoshi
Kochi Prefecture: Takeo Kakinuma
Kumamoto Prefecture: Ota Masahiro 
Kyoto Prefecture: Jūshirō Kiuchi (until May); Eitaro Mabuchi (starting May)
Mie Prefecture: Miki Nagano 
Miyagi Prefecture: Tsunenosuke Hamada 
Miyazaki Prefecture: Shutaro Horiuchi 
Nagano Prefecture: Tenta Akaboshi 
Niigata Prefecture: Watanabe Katsusaburo 
Okayama Prefecture: Masao Kishimoto
Okinawa Prefecture: Kuniyoshi Suzuki 
Saga Prefecture: Muneyoshi Oshiba 
Saitama Prefecture: Tadahiko Okada
Shiname Prefecture: Yasukichi Nishimura 
Tochigi Prefecture: Hiroyoshi Hiratsuka 
Tokyo: Yuichi Ionue
Toyama Prefecture: Takashi Inoue 
Yamagata Prefecture: Ichiro Yoda

Events
January 9 – According to Japanese government official confirmed report, a worst powder snow avalanche hit into residential area in Mitsumata village, (present day of Yuzawa), Niigata Prefecture, 158 person were human fatalities. 
January 20 – According to Japanese government official confirmed report, a secondary massibie powder snow avalanche hit in residence area in Asahi village, (present day of Tsuruoka), Yamagata Prefecture, total 154 persons were human fatalities. 
July – September – Rice riots: a series of popular disturbances erupt throughout Japan over the precipitous rise in the price of rice causing extreme economic hardship, particularly in rural areas where rice was the main staple of life. 
September 29 –  Hara Takashi becomes Prime Minister, the first commoner to be appointed to the office.
 November 11 –  World War I ends: Germany signs an armistice agreement with the Allies in a railroad car outside Compiègne in France.
 November 22 – Nippon-United States (Nichibei) Sheet Grass, as predecessor of Nippon Sheet Grass was founded in Osaka. 
date unknown - Start of the French military mission to Japan (1918-1919)
 Founded
 Citizen Watch (シチズン時計), as predecessor name was Shōkōsha Watch Institute Research.
 Glory (グローリー), as predecessor name was Kokuei Machine Manufacturing.
 Hochiki (ホーチキ), as predecessor name was Tokyo Hochiki.
 Panasonic (パナソニック), as predecessor name was Matsushita Electronics Work Manufacturing.
 Tokyu Land (東急不動産), as predecessor name was Denen Toshi Developer.
Resona Holdings, as predecessor name was Osaka Nomura Bank (大阪野村銀行).
Sundai Preparatory School (駿台予備校), as predecessor name was Tokyo Higher Examination School.

Births
January 31 – Michiyo Kogure, film actress (d. 1990)
February 4 – Yuzo Kawashima,  film director (d. 1963)
February 13 – Junichi Sasai, aviator  (d. 1942)
April 1 – Utako Okamoto, medical doctor (d. 2016)
May 4 – Kakuei Tanaka, 64th Prime Minister of Japan (d. 1993)
May 27 – Yasuhiro Nakasone, 45th Prime Minister of Japan (d. 2019)
July 2 – Fumiko Hori, painter (d. 2019)
September 17 – Marii Hasegawa, peace activist (d. 2012)
October 4 – Kenichi Fukui, chemist, Nobel laureate in chemistry (d. 1998)
October 8 – Sanae Takasugi, actress (d. 1995)
December 15 – Chihiro Iwasaki, artist and illustrator (d 1974)

Deaths
February 4 – Akiyama Saneyuki, soldier (b. 1868)
February 10 – Hachisuka Mochiaki, politician, former daimyō (b. 1846)
September 17 – Motono Ichirō politician and diplomat (b. 1862)
September 30 – Ōura Kanetake, politician (born 1850)
date unknown – Arakaki Seishō, Okinawan martial arts master (born 1840)

See also
List of Japanese films of the 1910s
Asian and Pacific theatre of World War I
Japan during World War I
Japanese intervention in Siberia

References

 
1910s in Japan
Japan